The 2012–13 Northern Iowa Panthers men's basketball team represented the University of Northern Iowa during the 2012–13 NCAA Division I men's basketball season. The Panthers, led by seventh year head coach Ben Jacobson, played their home games at McLeod Center and were members of the Missouri Valley Conference. They finished the season 21–15, 11–7 in MVC play to finish in third place. They lost in the quarterfinals of the Missouri Valley tournament to Illinois State. They were invited to the 2013 CIT where they defeated North Dakota, UIC and Bradley to advance to the semifinals where they lost to Weber State.

Roster

Schedule

|-
!colspan=9| Exhibition

|-
!colspan=9| Regular season

|-
!colspan=9| 2013 Missouri Valley Conference tournament

|-
!colspan=9| 2013 CIT

References

Northern Iowa Panthers men's basketball seasons
Northern Iowa
Northern Iowa
Panth
Panth